Geraldine Hughes (born 1970) is an actress from Belfast, Northern Ireland.
Born in West Belfast, Hughes has appeared in films such as Duplex, Rocky Balboa, and Gran Torino. She also played Mary Todd Lincoln in Killing Lincoln. More recently, she performed a solo play written by herself,  Belfast Blues.

Early life
Hughes grew up in the Divis Flats in Belfast, Northern Ireland, during The Troubles. To get herself through the tough times, Hughes participated in her school's drama club. She loved school, saying it made her feel safe and she enjoyed the structure it provided. It was where she escaped from The Troubles. After being chosen for her role in the film Children in the Crossfire, Hughes spent her first summer in the United States. She had no acting experience beyond her school's drama club before accepting her role as Mary in the movie.

Education
In Belfast, Hughes attended St. Louise's Comprehensive College in the '80s. Later, she attended the University of California in Los Angeles (UCLA) with a private scholarship from those she worked with in the film Children in the Crossfire. While they paid her tuition, she paid her living expenses. Hughes graduated from the university with a BA from the School of Theater, Film and TV. And in 2009, Queens University in Belfast awarded Hughes an honorary doctorate for her contributions to the performing arts.

Career
When Hughes was just 14, American TV producers auditioned hundreds of children in Ireland for their film and of the hundreds, three were chosen to participate in the film, Hughes being one of them. This first film debut of hers was in the movie, Children of the Crossfire in the year 1984. Later, during her first years in Los Angeles, Hughes became a part-time nanny to Danny DeVito and Rhea Perlman's children.

After a theater performance, Hughes was contacted by a casting director and asked to audition for the role of Marie in Rocky Balboa, a role she is arguably most known for.

Hughes has been and continues to work in the field of performing arts.

Family and personal life
Hughes comes from a working-class family in Belfast, Northern Ireland. She grew up in a Catholic household. Because she lived during The Troubles, Hughes experienced life in a war zone. Belfast Blues is a play she wrote detailing her real life experiences from her life in Belfast. As a child, Hughes never spoke of the horrors she witnessed in Belfast. Her performances of this play are dedicated “to all the children who live in places of conflict.” Hughes left Belfast at the age of 18. She lived in Los Angeles for 16 years then moved to New York City. Family comes first for Hughes as she regularly returns to Belfast for visits.

Hughes was married to an American from Pennsylvania, Ian Harrington. He also "came from nothin'' as his family was very poor. He was the first to encourage Hughes to share her story.

Filmography and theatrical appearances

Film

Television

Theater

Awards and nominations
Hughes received her first award in 2003, the Los Angeles Ovation Award. Just a year later, in 2004 she received the Garland and Drama Critics Circle Awards. Hughes also received a nomination for Distinguished Performance from the Drama League Award for her acting in her solo play, Belfast Blues, in 2004.

References

External links
 
 NY Times article about Belfast Blues.

1970 births
Living people
Film actresses from Northern Ireland
Stage actresses from Northern Ireland
20th-century actresses from Northern Ireland
21st-century actresses from Northern Ireland
Actresses from Belfast
Date of birth missing (living people)